Gadzhimurad Gazigandovich Rashidov (born 30 October 1995) is a Russian freestyle wrestler who competes at 65 kilograms. He is the 2019 World Champion (finalist in 2017 and 2018) and the 2020 and three-time Russian National Champion. 2020 Summer Olympics bronze medalist at 65 kg.

Nicknamed the All-American killer, Rashidov holds an undefeated 5–0 record against American wrestlers, who combine fifteen All-American honors and nine NCAA Division I National titles.

Background
Rashidov was born and raised in the Gubden village, Dagestan. He started wrestling at the age of six on his home, under his father.

After finishing high school in 2011, he moved to Kaspiysk, and started training at Gamidov's Wrestling Academy, in Makhachkala. As the trips from his house to the school were too long, he switched to Kuramagomedov's wrestling academy, which is located in Kaspiysk, under Said Gireyev and his father.

Career

Age-group 
Rashidov was a two-time Cadet World Champion in 2011 and 2012, and a two-time Junior World Championship silver medalist, in 2014 and 2015.

Senior level

2012-2015 
Rashidov made his senior freestyle debut in 2012, when he placed third at the Ali Aliev Memorial International. In 2015, after placing fifth at the Ivan Yarygin Grand Prix, Rashidov claimed a bronze medal at the Russian Nationals, and then went on to help the Russian Team win gold at the European Nations Cup.

2016 
To start off the year, Rashidov dropped down from 61 to 57 kilograms, and claimed a bronze medal from the Ivan Yarygin Grand Prix in January. He then became the '16 European Champion, racking up wins over Asadulla Lachinau and two-time Cadet World Champion Andriy Yatsenko. On May, he competed at the Russian Nationals, where after  defeating '14 Junior World Champion Azamat Tuskaev, the Dagestan National Team decided to withdraw all the Dagestani wrestlers from the championship, after frustration due to the final decision regarding the conflict between Viktor Lebedev and Ismail Musukaev, which led to a forfeit from Rashidov.

2017 World Wrestling Championships
After defeats over Viktor Rassadin of Sakha-Yakutia at the 2017 Russian National Freestyle Wrestling Championships, he competed at the 2017 World Championships in Paris. His first opponent was Jozsef Molnar of Hungary; Rashidov beat him by technical fall (11-0). In the round of eight, he won 11–0 over NCAA four-time champion from Ohio State Logan Stieber. In the quarterfinal, he rematched World and Olympic champion Vladimer Khinchegashvili of Georgia and beat him by the score, 6–3. In the semifinal Rashidov faced with his countryman from Krasnoyarsk, Opan Sat. Rashidov won the wrestling match (8-2). In the gold medal match, Rashidov lost to three-times world champion from Azerbaijan, Haji Aliyev, by pinfall.

2018 European Wrestling Championships
Rashidov won European world team trials at the Ivan Yarygin 2018 and represented the Russian team at 61 kilos at the 2018 European Wrestling Championships. His first opponent was  Vladimir Burukov of Ukraine, he won the match within a minute. In the second round he beat his countryman from Sakha Republic who represent the Belarus Nurgun Skryabin. In semifinals, he faced Recep Topal of Turkey and beat him by the score, 4–0. In the gold medal match, he beat Beka Lomtadze of Georgia and won the second European title in his career.

2018 World Wrestling Championships

Rashidov made Russia World Team Member and competed at the World Wrestling Championships in Budapest, Hungary. His first opponent in men's freestyle at 61 kilos was Tümenbilegiin Tüvshintulga of Mongolia where Rashidov won in close match by score 2–1. In the quarterfinals, Rashidov faced Indian national champion Sonba Tanaji Gongane, the wrestling match finished by technical superiority by Rashidov (12-0). In the semifinals, Rashdidov faced  Beka Lomtadze and beat him by technical superiority (10-0). In the gold medal match he lost by 6–5 to Yowlys Bonne of Cuba.

Ivan Yarygin 2019 and new weight class
Rashidov decided to compete at 65 kilos for the 2020 Olympic cycle, at Yarygin 2019 in the warm-up he got hand injury, in the first match he faced American folkstyle superstar and NCAA 3-time champion Zain Retherford of Penn State. He won the match by score (4-3), then he faced 2-time world bronze medalist Akhmed Chakaev of Chechnya and lost. For bronze medal match Rashidov faced Cristian Lopez of Cuba and won the match by score (2-1).

He made his debut at the World Championships 2019 in his new weight of class of 65 kg, in the first round he beat Haji Aliyev of Azerbaijan - in a rematch of the 2017 World Wrestling Championships' final at 61 kg - by score (4-2). In the quarterfinal, he beat his teammate Gadzhimurad Aliev (Haji Mohamad Ali) by score (9-0), in the semifinal he beat his countryman Ismail Muuskaev in a close match (3-2), in the final match he defeated Daulet Niyazbekov of Kazakhstan and won the gold medal.

Championships and achievements
Senior level:
2015 Russian Nationals bronze medalist – 61 kg
Golden Grand Prix Ivan Yarygin 2016 bronze medalist – 57 kg
2016 European Wrestling Championships gold medalist – 57 kg
2016 Russian Nationals 11th – 57 kg
2016 World Cup silver medalist – 57 kg
2016 Yusup Abdusalamov international winner – 65  kg
Golden Grand Prix Ivan Yarygin 2017 runner-up – 61 kg
2017 U23 European Championship gold medalist – 61 kg
2018 Golden Grand Prix Ivan Yarygin 2018 winner – 61 kg
2018 European Wrestling Championships gold medalist – 61 kg
Golden Grand Prix Ivan Yarygin 2019 3rd – 65 kg
2019 World Wrestling Championships 1st - 65 kg

Freestyle record

! colspan="7"| International Freestyle Matches
|-
!  Res.
!  Record
!  Opponent
!  Score
!  Date
!  Event
!  Location
|-
! style=background:white colspan=7 |
|-
|Win
|89–12
|align=left| Iszmail Muszukajev
|style="font-size:88%"|5–0
|style="font-size:88%" rowspan=4|August 6–7, 2021
|style="font-size:88%" rowspan=4|2020 Summer Olympics
|style="text-align:left;font-size:88%;" rowspan=4| Tokyo, Japan
|-
|Loss
|88–12
|align=left| Takuto Otoguro
|style="font-size:88%"|2–3
|-
|Win
|88–11
|align=left| Magomedmurad Gadzhiev
|style="font-size:88%"|6–2
|-
|Win
|87–11
|align=left| Vazgen Tevanyan
|style="font-size:88%"|6–0
|-
! style=background:white colspan=7 |
|-
|Win
|86–11
|align=left| Ildus Giniyatullin
|style="font-size:88%"|TF
|style="font-size:88%" rowspan=2|June 19, 2021
|style="font-size:88%" rowspan=2|2021 Sassari City International
|style="text-align:left;font-size:88%;" rowspan=2|
 Sassari, Italy
|-
|Win
|85–11
|align=left| Saul Bello Alvarez
|style="font-size:88%"|TF 10–0
|-
! style=background:white colspan=7 |
|-
|Win
|84–11
|align=left| Zagir Shakhiev
|style="font-size:88%"|5–3
|style="font-size:88%" rowspan=5|March 13–14, 2021
|style="font-size:88%" rowspan=5|2021 Russian National Championships
|style="text-align:left;font-size:88%;" rowspan=5|
 Ulan-Ude, Russia
|-
|Win
|83–11
|align=left| Ramazan Ferzaliev
|style="font-size:88%"|2–2
|-
|Win
|82–11
|align=left| Murshid Mutalimov
|style="font-size:88%"|TF 11–0
|-
|Win
|81–11
|align=left| Abdulmazhid Kudiev
|style="font-size:88%"|2–0
|-
|Win
|80–11
|align=left| Konstantin Kaprynov
|style="font-size:88%"|TF 11–0
|-
! style=background:white colspan=7 |
|-
|Loss
|
|align=left| Haji Aliyev
|style="font-size:88%"|INJ
|style="font-size:88%"|December 17, 2020
|style="font-size:88%"|2020 Individual World Cup
|style="text-align:left;font-size:88%;" |
 Belgrade, Serbia
|-
! style=background:white colspan=7 |
|-
|Win
|79–11
|align=left| Akhmed Chakaev
|style="font-size:88%"|2–0
|style="font-size:88%" rowspan=3|October 16–18, 2020
|style="font-size:88%" rowspan=3|2020 Russian National Championships
|style="text-align:left;font-size:88%;" rowspan=3|
 Naro-Fominsk, Russia
|-
|Win
|78–11
|align=left| Muslim Saidulaev
|style="font-size:88%"|6–0
|-
|Win
|77–11
|align=left| Alan Gogaev
|style="font-size:88%"|2–1
|-
! style=background:white colspan=7 |
|-
|Win
|76–11
|align=left| Vasyl Shuptar
|style="font-size:88%"|TF 10–0
|style="font-size:88%" rowspan=4|October 21–24, 2019
|style="font-size:88%" rowspan=4|2019 Military World Games
|style="text-align:left;font-size:88%;" rowspan=4|
 Wuhan, China
|-
|Win
|75–11
|align=left| Baurzhan Torebek
|style="font-size:88%"|TF 10–0
|-
|Win
|74–11
|align=left| Tian Zhenguang
|style="font-size:88%"|TF 11–0
|-
|Win
|73–11
|align=left| Gerchek Hemraev
|style="font-size:88%"|TF 10–0
|-
! style=background:white colspan=7 |
|-
|Win
|72–11
|align=left| Daulet Niyazbekov
|style="font-size:88%"|TF 11–0
|style="font-size:88%" rowspan=6|September 19–20, 2019
|style="font-size:88%" rowspan=6|2019 World Championships
|style="text-align:left;font-size:88%;" rowspan=6|
 Nur-Sultan, Kazakhstan
|-
|Win
|71–11
|align=left| Ismail Musukaev
|style="font-size:88%"|3–2
|-
|Win
|70–11
|align=left| Haji Mohamad Ali
|style="font-size:88%"|9–0
|-
|Win
|69–11
|align=left| Takuto Otoguro
|style="font-size:88%"|8–1
|-
|Win
|68–11
|align=left| Amr Reda
|style="font-size:88%"|5–3
|-
|Win
|67–11
|align=left| Haji Aliyev
|style="font-size:88%"|4–2
|-
! style=background:white colspan=7 |
|-
|Win
|66–11
|align=left| Nachyn Kuular
|style="font-size:88%"|5–3
|style="font-size:88%" rowspan=5|July 5–7, 2019
|style="font-size:88%" rowspan=5|2019 Russian National Championships
|style="text-align:left;font-size:88%;" rowspan=5|
 Sochi, Russia
|-
|Win
|65–11
|align=left| Murshid Mutalimov
|style="font-size:88%"|3–1
|-
|Win
|64–11
|align=left| Aisen Potapov
|style="font-size:88%"|6–0
|-
|Win
|63–11
|align=left| Azor Ionov
|style="font-size:88%"|TF 10–0
|-
|Win
|62–11
|align=left| Vitaly Kanzychakov
|style="font-size:88%"|5–0
|-
! style=background:white colspan=7 |
|-
|Win
|61–11
|align=left| Daichi Takatani
|style="font-size:88%"|TF 10–0
|style="font-size:88%"|March 16–17, 2019
|style="font-size:88%"|2019 World Cup
|style="text-align:left;font-size:88%;"|
 Yakutsk, Russia
|-
! style=background:white colspan=7 |
|-
|Win
|60–11
|align=left| Cristian Solenzal
|style="font-size:88%"|2–1
|style="font-size:88%" rowspan=3|January 24–27, 2019
|style="font-size:88%" rowspan=3|Golden Grand Prix Ivan Yarygin 2019
|style="text-align:left;font-size:88%;" rowspan=3|
 Krasnoyarsk, Russia
|-
|Loss
|59–11
|align=left| Akhmed Chakaev
|style="font-size:88%"|2–3
|-
|Win
|59–10
|align=left| Zain Retherford
|style="font-size:88%"|4–3
|-
! style=background:white colspan=7 |
|-
|Loss
|58–10
|align=left| Yowlys Bonne
|style="font-size:88%"|5–6
|style="font-size:88%" rowspan=4|October 20–21, 2018
|style="font-size:88%" rowspan=4|2018 World Championships
|style="text-align:left;font-size:88%;" rowspan=4|
 Budapest, Hungary
|-
|Win
|58–9
|align=left| Beka Lomtadze
|style="font-size:88%"|TF 10–0
|-
|Win
|57–9
|align=left| Sonba Tanaji Gongane
|style="font-size:88%"|TF 12–0
|-
|Win
|56–9
|align=left| Tümenbilegiin Tüvshintulga
|style="font-size:88%"|2–1
|-
! style=background:white colspan=7 |
|-
|Win
|55–9
|align=left| Kuat Amirtayev
|style="font-size:88%"|5–0
|style="font-size:88%" rowspan=4|September 7–9, 2018
|style="font-size:88%" rowspan=4|2018 Poland Open
|style="text-align:left;font-size:88%;" rowspan=4|
 Warsaw, Poland
|-
|Win
|54–9
|align=left| Magomedrasul Idrisov
|style="font-size:88%"|2–1
|-
|Win
|53–9
|align=left| Cory Clark
|style="font-size:88%"|TF 11–0
|-
|Win
|52–9
|align=left| Yo Nakata
|style="font-size:88%"|6–2
|-
! style=background:white colspan=7 |
|-
|Win
|51–9
|align=left| Beka Lomtadze
|style="font-size:88%"|4–1
|style="font-size:88%" rowspan=4|May 5–6, 2018
|style="font-size:88%" rowspan=4|2018 European Continental Championships
|style="text-align:left;font-size:88%;" rowspan=4|
 Kaspiysk, Russia
|-
|Win
|50–9
|align=left| Recep Topal
|style="font-size:88%"|4–0
|-
|Win
|49–9
|align=left| Nurgun Skryabin
|style="font-size:88%"|10–1
|-
|Win
|48–9
|align=left| Volodymyr Burukov
|style="font-size:88%"|TF 10–0
|-
! style=background:white colspan=7 |
|-
|Win
|47–9
|align=left| Vasyl Shuptar
|style="font-size:88%"|9–1
|style="font-size:88%" rowspan=4|March 22–25, 2018
|style="font-size:88%" rowspan=4|2018 Dan Kolov – Nikola Petrov Memorial
|style="text-align:left;font-size:88%;" rowspan=4|
 Sofia, Bulgaria
|-
|Win
|46–9
|align=left| Filip Novachkov
|style="font-size:88%"|TF 11–0
|-
|Win
|45–9
|align=left| Utku Doğan
|style="font-size:88%"|11–2
|-
|Win
|44–9
|align=left| Hor Ohannesian
|style="font-size:88%"|6–2
|-
! style=background:white colspan=7 |
|-
|Win
|43–9
|align=left| Ismail Musukaev
|style="font-size:88%"|3–2
|style="font-size:88%" rowspan=3|January 26, 2018
|style="font-size:88%" rowspan=3|Golden Grand Prix Ivan Yarygin 2018
|style="text-align:left;font-size:88%;" rowspan=3|
 Krasnoyarsk, Russia
|-
|Win
|42–9
|align=left| Aleksandr Bogomoev
|style="font-size:88%"|2–0
|-
|Win
|41–9
|align=left| Tony Ramos
|style="font-size:88%"|TF 11–0
|-
! style=background:white colspan=7 |
|-
|Loss
|40–9
|align=left| Haji Aliyev
|style="font-size:88%"|Fall
|style="font-size:88%" rowspan=5|August 25, 2017
|style="font-size:88%" rowspan=5|2017 World Championships
|style="text-align:left;font-size:88%;" rowspan=5|
 Paris, France
|-
|Win
|40–8
|align=left| Cengizhan Erdoğan
|style="font-size:88%"|8–2
|-
|Win
|39–8
|align=left| Vladimer Khinchegashvili
|style="font-size:88%"|6–3
|-
|Win
|38–8
|align=left| Logan Stieber
|style="font-size:88%"|TF 11–0
|-
|Win
|37–8
|align=left| József Molnár
|style="font-size:88%"|TF 11–0
|-
! style=background:white colspan=7 |
|-
|Win
|36–8
|align=left| Viktor Rassadin
|style="font-size:88%"|3–3
|style="font-size:88%" rowspan=5|June 12, 2017
|style="font-size:88%" rowspan=5|2017 Russian National Championships
|style="text-align:left;font-size:88%;" rowspan=5|
 Nazran, Russia
|-
|Win
|35–8
|align=left| Akhmed Chakaev
|style="font-size:88%"|11–8
|-
|Win
|34–8
|align=left| Bekkhan Goygereyev
|style="font-size:88%"|2–1
|-
|Win
|33–8
|align=left| Nurgun Skryabin
|style="font-size:88%"|3–0
|-
|Win
|32–8
|align=left| Shamil Guseinov
|style="font-size:88%"|5–0
|-
! style=background:white colspan=7 |
|-
|Win
|31–8
|align=left| Sedat Özdemir
|style="font-size:88%"|TF 10–0
|style="font-size:88%" rowspan=4|March 28 – April 2, 2017
|style="font-size:88%" rowspan=4|2017 U23 European Continental Championships
|style="text-align:left;font-size:88%;" rowspan=4|
 Szombathely, Hungary
|-
|Win
|30–8
|align=left| Ali Rahimzade
|style="font-size:88%"|4–2
|-
|Win
|29–8
|align=left| Robert Kardos
|style="font-size:88%"|TF 10–0
|-
|Win
|28–8
|align=left| Randy Vock
|style="font-size:88%"|TF 10–0
|-
! style=background:white colspan=7 |
|-
|Loss
|27–8
|align=left| Akhmed Chakaev
|style="font-size:88%"|2–2
|style="font-size:88%" rowspan=6|January 28, 2017
|style="font-size:88%" rowspan=6|Golden Grand Prix Ivan Yarygin 2017
|style="text-align:left;font-size:88%;" rowspan=6|
 Krasnoyarsk, Russia
|-
|Win
|27–7
|align=left| Bulat Batoev
|style="font-size:88%"|TF 12–2
|-
|Win
|26–7
|align=left| Bekkhan Goygereyev
|style="font-size:88%"|8–0
|-
|Win
|25–7
|align=left| Nyurgun Skryabin
|style="font-size:88%"|4–1
|-
|Win
|24–7
|align=left| Cody Brewer
|style="font-size:88%"|TF 12–1
|-
|Win
|23–7
|align=left| Rei Higuchi
|style="font-size:88%"|3–1
|-
! style=background:white colspan=7 |
|-
|Win
|22–7
|align=left| Shikhsaid Jalilov
|style="font-size:88%"|
|style="font-size:88%" rowspan=2|October 22–23, 2016
|style="font-size:88%" rowspan=2|2016 Yusup Abdusalamov Memorial
|style="text-align:left;font-size:88%;" rowspan=2|
 Russia
|-
|Win
|21–7
|align=left|
|style="font-size:88%"|
|-
! style=background:white colspan=7 |
|-
|Loss
|20–7
|align=left| Hassan Rahimi
|style="font-size:88%"|3–3
|style="font-size:88%" rowspan=3|June 11–12, 2016
|style="font-size:88%" rowspan=3|2016 World Cup
|style="text-align:left;font-size:88%;" rowspan=3|
 Los Angeles, California
|-
|Win
|20–6
|align=left| Süleyman Atlı
|style="font-size:88%"|10–4
|-
|Loss
|19–6
|align=left| Vladimer Khinchegashvili
|style="font-size:88%"|2–3
|-
! style=background:white colspan=7 |
|-
|Loss
|
|align=left| Aldar Balzhinimayev
|style="font-size:88%"|FF
|style="font-size:88%" rowspan=3|May 27, 2016
|style="font-size:88%" rowspan=3|2016 Russian National Championships
|style="text-align:left;font-size:88%;" rowspan=3|
 Yakutsk, Russia
|-
|Win
|19–5
|align=left| Nikolay Okhlopkov
|style="font-size:88%"|6–2
|-
|Win
|18–5
|align=left| Azamat Tuskaev
|style="font-size:88%"|5–3
|-
! style=background:white colspan=7 |
|-
|Win
|17–5
|align=left| Andriy Yatsenko
|style="font-size:88%"|8–2
|style="font-size:88%" rowspan=5|March 8, 2016
|style="font-size:88%" rowspan=5|2016 European Continental Championships
|style="text-align:left;font-size:88%;" rowspan=5|
 Riga, Latvia
|-
|Win
|16–5
|align=left| Asadulla Lachinau
|style="font-size:88%"|6–0
|-
|Win
|15–5
|align=left| Georgi Vangelov
|style="font-size:88%"|TF 10–0
|-
|Win
|14–5
|align=left| Levan Metreveli Vartanov
|style="font-size:88%"|TF 10–0
|-
|Win
|13–5
|align=left| Yuriy Holub
|style="font-size:88%"|TF 10–0
|-
! style=background:white colspan=7 |
|-
|Win
|12–5
|align=left| Vladimir Flegontov
|style="font-size:88%"|2–1
|style="font-size:88%" rowspan=5|January 27–29, 2016
|style="font-size:88%" rowspan=5|Golden Grand Prix Ivan Yarygin 2016
|style="text-align:left;font-size:88%;" rowspan=5|
 Krasnoyarsk, Russia
|-
|Loss
|11–5
|align=left| Aleksandr Bogomoev
|style="font-size:88%"|1–1
|-
|Win
|11–4
|align=left| Donduk-ool Khuresh-ool
|style="font-size:88%"|12–3
|-
|Win
|10–4
|align=left| Viktor Rassadin
|style="font-size:88%"|3–2
|-
|Win
|9–4
|align=left| Nyurgun Aleksandrov
|style="font-size:88%"|6–1
|-
! style=background:white colspan=7 |
|-
|Win
|8–4
|align=left| Münir Recep Aktaş
|style="font-size:88%"|TF 
|style="font-size:88%"|November 6–8, 2015
|style="font-size:88%"|2015 Open Cup of European Nations, Alrosa Cup
|style="text-align:left;font-size:88%;"|
 Moscow, Russia
|-
! style=background:white colspan=7 |
|-
|Win
|7–4
|align=left| Bato Badmaev
|style="font-size:88%"|3–2
|style="font-size:88%" rowspan=5|May 8–10, 2015
|style="font-size:88%" rowspan=5|2015 Russian National Championships
|style="text-align:left;font-size:88%;" rowspan=5|
 Kaspiysk, Russia
|-
|Loss
|6–4
|align=left| Aleksandr Bogomoev
|style="font-size:88%"|0–5
|-
|Win
|6–3
|align=left| Shamil Omarov
|style="font-size:88%"|Fall
|-
|Win
|5–3
|align=left| Niurgun Skriabin
|style="font-size:88%"|6–3
|-
|Win
|4–3
|align=left| Dasha Sharastepanov
|style="font-size:88%"|6–0
|-
! style=background:white colspan=7 |
|-
|Loss
|3–3
|align=left| Dzhamal Otarsultanov
|style="font-size:88%"|6–8
|style="font-size:88%" rowspan=5|January 22–26, 2015
|style="font-size:88%" rowspan=5|Golden Grand Prix Ivan Yarygin 2015
|style="text-align:left;font-size:88%;" rowspan=5|
 Krasnoyarsk, Russia
|-
|Win
|3–2
|align=left| Arash Dangesaraki
|style="font-size:88%"|TF 10–0
|-
|Loss
|2–2
|align=left| Aleksandr Bogomoev
|style="font-size:88%"|0–3
|-
|Win
|2–1
|align=left| Vladimir Flegontov
|style="font-size:88%"|9–1
|-
|Win
|1–1
|align=left| Soslan Aziev
|style="font-size:88%"|TF 12–0
|-
! style=background:white colspan=7 | 
|-
|Loss
|0–1
|align=left| Rustam Abdurashidov
|style="font-size:88%"|3–5
|style="font-size:88%"|May 24–25, 2014
|style="font-size:88%"|2014 Ali Aliev Memorial
|style="text-align:left;font-size:88%;" |
 Makhachkala, Russia
|-

References

External links
 

1995 births
Living people
People from Karabudakhkentsky District
Russian people of Dagestani descent
Russian male sport wrestlers
World Wrestling Championships medalists
European Wrestling Championships medalists
Wrestlers at the 2020 Summer Olympics
Medalists at the 2020 Summer Olympics
Olympic medalists in wrestling
Olympic bronze medalists for the Russian Olympic Committee athletes
Sportspeople from Dagestan
Olympic wrestlers of Russia
21st-century Russian people